Cielo d'Alcamo (also spelled Ciullo) was an Italian poet, born in the early 13th century. He is considered one of the fathers of Italian medieval jester poetry. His traditional surname (which would mean "from Alcamo", a town in northwestern Sicily) has been differently identified by other scholars as Dalcamo.  (The modern form of the name "Cielo" is "Michele" or "Michael".)  Cielo d'Alcamo and fellow 13th century poet Giacomo da Lentini are credited as the inventors of the love sonnet.

D'Alcamo is known exclusively from the poem "Rosa Fresca Aulentissima" ("Fresh and Very Perfumed Rose"), which contained in a single codex now in the Vatican Library. The date of execution has been assigned between 1231 and 1250.

Identified by some scholars (such as Francesco De Sanctis) as a popular work, "Rosa fresca aulentissima" was most likely written by an acculturated author, as testified by his knowledge of works such as the Roman de la Rose and by his likely  vicinity to Frederick II's court.

See also

Sicilian School

References

Sources

 Mendola, Louis (2015). Sicily's Rebellion against King Charles (includes poem of Cielo d'Alcamo in Sicilian and English), .

Italian poets
Italian male poets
People from Alcamo
Year of death unknown
Year of birth unknown
Sicilian School poets
13th-century Italian poets